Pleasant View is an unincorporated community in Lincoln County, West Virginia, United States.

References

Unincorporated communities in Lincoln County, West Virginia
Unincorporated communities in West Virginia
Populated places on the Guyandotte River